Schmeller is a surname. Notable people with the surname include:

 Johann Andreas Schmeller (1785–1852), Germanist
 Johann Joseph Schmeller (1796–1841), German painter
  (1920–1990), German-Austrian art historian, publicist

German-language surnames